Modulus nodosus is a species of sea snail, a marine gastropod mollusk in the family Modulidae.

Distribution

Description 
The maximum recorded shell length is 29.9 mm.

Habitat 
Minimum recorded depth is 10 m. Maximum recorded depth is 30 m.

References

External links

Modulidae
Gastropods described in 2001